Horsforth is a civil parish and a ward in the metropolitan borough of the City of Leeds, West Yorkshire, England.  The parish and ward contain 44 listed buildings that are recorded in the National Heritage List for England.  Of these, one is listed at Grade II*, the middle of the three grades, and the others are at Grade II, the lowest grade.  The parish and ward contain the town of Horsforth and the surrounding area.  Most of the listed buildings are houses and associated structures, farmhouses and farm buildings.  The other listed buildings include churches and Sunday schools, bridges and a toll house, a weir and retaining walls, a milepost, a former corn mill, a former mechanics' institute, two war memorials, and a telephone kiosk.


Key

Buildings

References

Citations

Sources

 

Lists of listed buildings in West Yorkshire
Listed